Tamás Bánusz (born 8 April 1989) is a Hungarian chess grandmaster.

Chess career
Born in 1989, Bánusz earned his international master title in 2005 and his grandmaster title in 2011. He is the No. 5 ranked Hungarian player as of February 2018.

References

External links
 
 

1989 births
Living people
Chess grandmasters
Hungarian chess players
People from Mohács